Bademli is a Turkish word, meaning "with almonds" or "place of almonds," and may refer to several places in Turkey:

 Bademli, Acıpayam
 Bademli, Ağın
 Bademli, Akseki, a village in the district of Akseki, Antalya Province
 Bademli, Aydın, a village in the district of Aydın, Aydın Province
 Bademli, Ayvacık
 Bademli, Bigadiç, a village
 Bademli, Bismil
 Bademli, Dicle
 Bademli, Dikili, a village in the district of Dekili, İzmir Province
 Bademli, Dinar, a village in the district of Dinar, Afyonkarahisar Province
 Bademli, Emirdağ, a village in the district of Emirdağ, Afyonkarahisar Province
 Bademli, Ergani
 Bademli, Gökçeada
 Bademli, Gümüşhacıköy, a village in the district of Gümüşhacıköy, Amasya Province
 Bademli, İspir
 Bademli, Karamanlı
 Bademli, Keban
 Bademli, Kızılcahamam, a village in the district of Kızılcahamam, Ankara Province
 Bademli, Ödemiş, a village in Ödemiş district of İzmir Province
 Bademli, Şuhut, a village in the district of Şuhut, Afyonkarahisar Province

See also 
 Bademli Dam, a dam in Burdur Province
 Bademlik, Çermik, Turkey